Sint-Katelijne-Waver is a railway station in the town of Sint-Katelijne-Waver, Antwerp, Belgium. The station opened on 1 June 1865 on the Lines 25 and 27. The train services are operated by National Railway Company of Belgium (NMBS).

Train services
The station is served by the following services:

Brussels RER services (S1) Antwerp - Mechelen - Brussels - Waterloo - Nivelles (weekdays)
Brussels RER services (S1) Antwerp - Mechelen - Brussels (weekends)

References

External links
 Sint-Katelijne-Waver railway station at Belgian Railways website

Railway stations opened in 1865
Railway stations in Belgium
Railway stations in Antwerp Province
Sint-Katelijne-Waver